Antonio Verzura (born 27 May 1992) is a retired Italian-Thai professional footballer who last played as a defensive midfielder and right back for Thai League 2 club Nakhon Si United.

Personal life

Antonio was born in Bangkok. His father is Italian and his mother is Thai. Antonio's twin younger brother Gionata is also a footballer and plays as a winger.

External links

References

1992 births
Living people
Antonio Verzura
Antonio Verzura
Antonio Verzura
Association football wingers
Antonio Verzura
Antonio Verzura
Antonio Verzura
Antonio Verzura
Antonio Verzura
Antonio Verzura
Antonio Verzura
Nakhon Si United F.C. players